American League Park  may refer to:

United States

Baseball parks
American League Park (Baltimore), renamed Oriole Park
American League Park, the first of two former baseball parks in Washington, DC with that name, the second ("American League Park II") often known as Boundary Field
American League Park (New York City), commonly known as Hilltop Park

See also
League Park (disambiguation)
National League Park (disambiguation)